is a term coined by Virgilio Almario that refers to Filipino-language hybrid words seemingly derived from both English and Spanish. The Komisyon sa Wikang Filipino under the administration of Almario has considered siyokoy words to be improper and therefore its use discouraged.

Background
 is a term coined by National Artist Virgilio Almario, who also chaired the Komisyon sa Wikang Filipino (KWF; Commission of Filipino Language). The term is derived from the Philippine mythological creature siyokoy, roughly equivalent to the merman.

It is used to describe hybrid words "not Spanish and not also English" and are said to be often made by educated people not aware of the proper equivalent of the  word in Spanish who want to use words that sound like Spanish. The phenomenon was first noticed when radio broadcaster Rod Navarro popularized the word konsernado—Hispanized from the English word "concerned". The Spanish translation for the word is concernido, and therefore the KWF asserts that the word in Filipino should be konsernído.

The proliferation of  words is fast due to its usage by celebrities, broadcasters, writers and academics who have limited knowledge in Spanish. The stance against  words is instituted in the KWF Manwal sa Masinop na Pagsulat style guide, which was written by Almario as KWF chair. Almario, who has been critical of  words since 1976, is more tolerant of jejemon and bekimon, which he characterize as "cultured language" meant to be intelligible by everyone and thus are not "permanent languages".

Alternatives
Instead of using  words, Almario suggests consulting an English–Spanish dictionary and deriving the Filipino word from the Spanish term. He also prefers Filipino speakers to straight up use English terminologies if they are not aware of the Spanish equivalent. The most preferable approach is to use existing Filipino words such as larawan for "image".

Examples
The following are examples of  words, their equivalent in English and Spanish, as well as the proper Filipino language equivalent as suggested by Almario or the KWF.

References 

Linguistic morphology
Macaronic language
Word coinage
Filipino language
Macaronic forms of English
Philippine English
Spanish language in the Philippines
Metaphors referring to people